Resseliella is a genus of gall midges in the family Cecidomyiidae. There are at least 50 described species in Resseliella.

Species
These 50 species belong to the genus Resseliella:

 Resseliella aurata (Felt, 1908) i c g
 Resseliella betulicola (Kieffer, 1889) c g
 Resseliella californica (Felt, 1914) i c g b
 Resseliella carnea (Kieffer, 1924) c g
 Resseliella cincta (Felt, 1918) i c g
 Resseliella cinctella (Kieffer, 1913) i c g
 Resseliella clavula (Beutenmuller, 1892) i c g b (dogwood club gall midge)
 Resseliella conicola (Foote, 1956) i c g
 Resseliella coryli (Felt, 1907) i c g
 Resseliella coryloides (Foote, 1956) i c g
 Resseliella crassa (Möhn, 1955) c g
 Resseliella crataegi (Barnes, 1939) c g
 Resseliella dizygomyzae (Barnes, 1933) c g
 Resseliella emblicae Chandra, 1991 c g
 Resseliella fruticosi (Pitcher, 1955) c g
 Resseliella galegae (Neacs(with line beneath)u, 1971) c g
 Resseliella hudsoni (Felt, 1907) i c g
 Resseliella ingrica (Mamaev, 1971) c g
 Resseliella lavandulae (Barnes, 1953) c g
 Resseliella liriodendri (Osten Sacken, 1862) i c g b
 Resseliella maccus (Loew, 1862) i c g
 Resseliella maxima Gagné, 2019 
 Resseliella meridionalis (Mamaev, 1965) c g
 Resseliella oculiperda (Rübsaamen, 1893) c g
 Resseliella odai (Inouye, 1955) c g
 Resseliella oleisuga (Targioni-Tozzetti, 1887) c g
 Resseliella orientalis (Felt, 1918) c
 Resseliella perplexa (Felt, 1908) i c g
 Resseliella piceae Seitner, 1906 c g
 Resseliella pinifoliae (Felt, 1936) i c g
 Resseliella poecilantha Fedotova & Sidorenko, 2004 c g
 Resseliella proteae Gagne, 1983 c g
 Resseliella quadrifasciata (Niwa, 1910) c g
 Resseliella quercivora (Mamaev, 1965) c g
 Resseliella radicis (Felt, 1936) i c g
 Resseliella ranunculi (Kieffer, 1909) c g
 Resseliella resinicola Sanui & Yukawa, 1985 c g
 Resseliella resinophaga (Mamaev, 1971) c g
 Resseliella ribis (Marikovskij, 1956) c g
 Resseliella salicicola Fedotova, 2003 c g
 Resseliella salvadorae Rao, 1951 c g
 Resseliella sibirica (Mamaev, 1971) c g
 Resseliella silvana (Felt, 1908) i c g
 Resseliella skuhravyorum Skrzypczynska, 1975 c g
 Resseliella soya (Monzen, 1936) c g
 Resseliella syringogenea (Hering, 1943) c g
 Resseliella tenuis (Loew, 1850) c g
 Resseliella theobaldi (Barnes, 1927) c g
 Resseliella trianguliceps (Debski, 1918) c g
 Resseliella tulipiferae (Osten Sacken, 1862) i c g
 Resseliella vespicoloris (Barnes, 1933) c g

Data sources: i = ITIS, c = Catalogue of Life, g = GBIF, b = Bugguide.net

References

Further reading

 
 
 
 
 

Cecidomyiinae
Articles created by Qbugbot
Cecidomyiidae genera